George Cronjé (born ) is a South African rugby union player for the  in Super Rugby Unlocked and  in the Currie Cup. His regular position is flanker.

Cronjé was named in the  squad for the Super Rugby Unlocked competition.

References

South African rugby union players
Living people
2001 births
Rugby union flankers
Free State Cheetahs players
Rugby union players from Bloemfontein
Cheetahs (rugby union) players